Nelson Coral Nye (1907–1997) was an American writer, editor, and reviewer of Western fiction, and wrote non-fiction books on quarter horses. Besides Nelson C. Nye he also wrote fiction using the pseudonyms Clem Colt and Drake C. Denver. He wrote over 125 books, won two Spur Awards: one for best Western reviewer and critic, and one for his novel Long Run, and in 1968 won the Saddleman Award for "“Outstanding Contributions to the American West.”

Nelson Nye was born September 28, 1907 in Chicago, Illinois. Before becoming a ranch hand in 1935, he wrote publicity releases and book reviews for the Cincinnati Times-Star and the Buffalo Evening News. He published his first novel in 1936 and continued writing for 60 years. He served with the U.S. Army field artillery during World War II. He worked as the horse editor for Texas Livestock Journal from 1949–1952.

In 1953 Nye co-founded the Western Writers of America (WWA) and served as its first president during 1953–1954. He was also the first editor of ROUNDUP, the WWA periodical that is still published today.

From 1958–1962 he was the frontier fiction reviewer for the New York Times Book Review, and served a second term as president of the WWA from 1960–1961.

Nye became a breeder and trainer of, and expert on, quarter horses, and wrote several non-fiction books on quarter horses and quarter racing. Nye died October 4, 1997 in Tucson at the age of 90.

Publications

Nonfiction

Fiction

 (novelization of the screenplay by Leon Uris)

References

External links
 Western Writers of America
 
 
 

1907 births
1997 deaths
Western (genre) writers
20th-century American novelists
American male novelists
Novelists from Arizona
Writers from Tucson, Arizona
20th-century American male writers